The 2016 Lamar Hunt U.S. Open Cup was the 103rd edition of the oldest ongoing competition in American soccer.

On September 8, 2015 the United States Soccer Federation decided to prevent professional teams that were "majority owned by a higher-level Outdoor Professional League Team" from taking part in the competition. This rule prevented several United Soccer League teams (Bethlehem Steel FC, LA Galaxy II, New York Red Bulls II,  Orlando City B, Portland Timbers 2, Real Monarchs, Seattle Sounders FC 2 and Swope Park Rangers) from competing. New York Cosmos Chief Operating Officer Erik Stover stated that eligible New York Cosmos B would not enter as "the integrity of the tournament is more important". The Houston Dynamo staffed, but not owned, Rio Grande Valley FC Toros were also ruled ineligible by USSF at the request of the Dynamo.

Major League Soccer (MLS) teams New York Red Bulls, Portland Timbers, and Seattle Sounders FC each entered their under-23 amateur sides. US Soccer announced that these MLS sides could not play their affiliated sides before the Open Cup Final. The same rule holds for the NASL's Indy Eleven and their amateur side Indy Eleven NPSL.

The cash prize amounts were the same as those in 2015, with the champion receiving $250,000 and the runner-up $60,000. Also, the team from each lower division that advanced the furthest received $15,000. The champion of the tournament also received a berth in the 2018 CONCACAF Champions League.

Qualification 

All United States Division I (MLS), Division II (NASL), and Division III (USL) teams qualified automatically, except teams that are majority owned by a higher-level outdoor professional league team. This rule prevented United Soccer League teams Bethlehem Steel FC, LA Galaxy II, New York Red Bulls II, Orlando City B, Portland Timbers 2, Real Monarchs, Seattle Sounders FC 2 and Swope Park Rangers from competing. New York Cosmos B (NPSL) also stated that they would not enter the competition. The Rio Grande Valley FC Toros were ruled ineligible at the request of the Houston Dynamo. The New York Athletic Club (NPSL) withdrew before the access list was announced on February 5.

 $: Winner of $15,000 bonus for advancing the furthest in the competition from their respective divisions. 
 $$: Winner of $60,000 for being the runner-up in the competition.
 $$$: Winner of $250,000 for winning the competition.

Brackets 
Host team listed firstBold = winner* = after extra time, = penalty shootout score

Match details

First round
Draw announced April 6. All times local to game site.

Second round
Draw announced April 6. All times local to game site.

Third round
Draw announced May 12.

Fourth round
Draw announced May 19.

Round of 16
Draw announced June 16. The fourth round winners were drawn into four 4-team brackets based on geographic considerations.

Quarterfinals
The eight round of 16 winners played the other survivor in their geographic arm of the bracket.

Semifinals
The draw to determine the semifinal hosts for the final teams from the eastern and western halves of the bracket took place on July 21 at Soccer House in Chicago and was conducted by U.S. Open Cup Commissioner Paul Marstaller. The semifinal matches were held on August 9–10.

Final

The hosting priority for the 2016 U.S. Open Cup Final took place subsequent to the semifinal host draw. The order went as follows: Chicago Fire, LA Galaxy, FC Dallas, New England Revolution.

Top Goalscorers 
Players and teams still active in bold.

References

External links 
 The Cup.us – Full Coverage of the US Open Cup

 
U.S. Open Cup
U.S. Open Cup